Ji-tae is a Korean male given name

People with this name include:
Justin Chon (born 1981), Korean American actor whose middle name is Jitae
Yoo Ji-tae (born 1976), South Korean actor and film director

Fictional characters with this name include:
Ji-tae, in 2012 South Korean film A Werewolf Boy

See also
List of Korean given names

Korean masculine given names